"Groovy Feeling" is the eighth single by the English electronic music band Fluke. Taken from the album, Six Wheels on My Wagon the track was the final single released by Fluke on 27 August in 1993 after the successes of Slid and Electric Guitar. In line with a reference pioneered by The KLF (see "Justified and Ancient") and prevalent throughout the British Electronic Music scene, all the remixes are named with references to various ice creams. The irony of this was compounded by the single's front cover containing an image of a set of teeth fitted with a dental brace.

Versions

Fluke (band) songs
1993 songs